The 2010 Southend-on-Sea Council election took place on 6 May 2010 to elect members of Southend-on-Sea Unitary Council in Essex, England. One third of the council was up for election.

Results summary

Ward results

Belfairs

Blenheim Park

Chalkwell

Eastwood Park

Kursaal

Leigh

Milton

Prittlewell

St. Laurence

St. Luke's

Shoeburyness

Southchurch

Thorpe

Victoria

West Leigh

West Shoebury

Westborough

References

2010
2010 English local elections
2010s in Essex